The Benelli Argo Comfortech rifle is manufactured by Italian arms manufacturer Benelli Armi SpA. It is a technologically advanced version of the Benelli Argo, employing patented Benelli Comfortech technology.

Design details
The Benelli Argo Comfortech has a rotating bolt head with three lugs, which combine to provide an effective locking surface. The fully tempered steel cover is equipped with holes for attaching scopes and is firmly connected to the barrel. This results in a greater accuracy at range. The free-moving barrel gives greater precision more akin to bolt-action models.

The plate kit used to adjust stock deviation and drop, together with the interchangeable sights, make the Benelli Argo Comfortech a versatile and multi-purpose rifle.

See also
 Benelli Argo
 Benelli Argo EL

External links
 Official homepage - Italy
 Official homepage - USA

Semi-automatic rifles